Meaford is a hamlet in the civil parish of Stone Rural, in the Stafford district, in the county of Staffordshire, England. It lies at the junction of the A34 and A51 roads, north of Stone on the River Trent. Meaford Lock is on the Trent and Mersey Canal. Meaford's most famous son is John Jervis, 1st Earl of St Vincent, the naval hero.

Meaford was for the later part of the 20th century easily identifiable from the main A34 road by the coal-fired Meaford Power Stations, operated by the CEGB and later National Power. Meaford 'A' of 120 MW capacity opened in the late 1940s, ceased generation in 1974 and was demolished in 1982.

The site and the remaining buildings are now owned by Helen Tolley 

Bury Bank, an Iron Age hillfort, is a short distance to the north.

See also
 Meaford Hall, Staffordshire

Hamlets in Staffordshire
Borough of Stafford